Tolkningarna means interpretations in Swedish. It may refer to:

Tolkningarna, 2011 EP by Lena Philipsson
Tolkningarna, 2012 EP by Laleh
Tolkningarna, 2013 EP by Pugh Rogefeldt
 Så mycket bättre 2017 – Tolkningarna, interpretations of a Swedish TV series Så mycket bättre
 Så mycket bättre 2020 – Tolkningarna